Karamustafapaşa is a village in the Merzifon District, Amasya Province, Turkey. Its population is 212 (2021). The village is named after Kara Mustafa Pasha, a 17th-century grand vizier of the Ottoman Empire.

References

Villages in Merzifon District